This is a list of the squads picked for the 2012 ICC World Twenty20.

Group A

Coach:  Kabir Khan

Coach:  Andy Flower

Coach:  Duncan Fletcher

Group B

Coach:  Mickey Arthur

Coach:  Phil Simmons

Coach:  Ottis Gibson

Group C

Coach:  Gary Kirsten

Coach:  Graham Ford

Coach:  Alan Butcher

Group D

Coach:  Richard Pybus

Coach:  Mike Hesson

Coach:  Dav Whatmore

References

 :Afghanistan World T20 squad  on sports.ndtv.com
 :England Squad on sports.ndtv.com
 :India Squad on sports.ndtv.com
 :India Squad on sports.ndtv.com
 :Australia Squad on sports.ndtv.com
 :West Indies Squad on sports.ndtv.com
 :Ireland Squad on sports.ndtv.com
 :Sri Lanka Squad on sports.ndtv.com
 :South Africa Squad on sports.ndtv.com
 :Zimbabwe Squad on sports.ndtv.com
 :Pakistan Squad on sports.ndtv.com
 :New Zealand Squad on sports.ndtv.com
 :Bangladesh Squad on sports.ndtv.com

External links
ICC World Twenty20 2012 squads on Sports.ndtv.com
2012 ICC World Twenty20 squads on ESPN CricInfo

2012 ICC World Twenty20
Cricket squads
ICC Men's T20 World Cup squads